Snoopy, Come Home! is a 1972 American animated musical comedy-drama film directed by Bill Melendez and written by Charles M. Schulz based on the Peanuts comic strip. The film marks the on-screen debut of Woodstock, who had first appeared in the strip in 1967. It was the only Peanuts film during composer Vince Guaraldi’s lifetime that did not have a score composed by him. Its music was composed by the Sherman Brothers, who composed the music for various Disney films like Mary Poppins (1964), The Jungle Book (1967), and Bedknobs and Broomsticks (1971). The film was released on August 9, 1972 by National General Corporation, produced by Lee Mendelson Films,  Bill Melendez Productions and Cinema Center Films (in the latter's final production). Despite receiving largely positive reviews, the film was a box-office flop, grossing only $245,073 against a production budget of over $1 million.

Plot 

Snoopy and the Peanuts gang go to the beach. Once there, Snoopy promises to return the next day to meet Peppermint Patty. After Charlie Brown goes home to play Monopoly with the others, he notices Snoopy is late and remarks he is tired of Snoopy's lateness. Snoopy silences him by taking off his collar (because of how much it cost Charlie to buy).

The next day, Snoopy is thrown off the beach due to a new "No Dogs Allowed on this beach" rule (thus setting a running gag in the film), leaving Peppermint Patty to think he stood her up (she thinks he's just "a funny looking kid with a big nose"). Then, Snoopy gets thrown out of a library due to a similar rule, to prevent his disruptive behavior. He takes out his anger by fighting Linus over his blanket, and later beats, and kisses, Lucy in a boxing match.

Later, Snoopy receives a letter from a girl named Lila, who has been in the hospital for three weeks and needs Snoopy to keep her company. Snoopy immediately sets off with Woodstock to go see her, leaving Charlie Brown in the dark as to who Lila is. Linus investigates, and discovers that Lila is Snoopy's original owner. When Lila's family discovered a new rule in their apartment building prohibiting dogs, they had to take him back to Daisy Hill Puppy Farm. Charlie Brown faints upon hearing this. Snoopy still remembers her, and decides to go see her in the hospital.

En route to see Lila, Snoopy and Woodstock face the challenges of a world full of "No Dogs Allowed" signs. Each instance—on a bus, a train, and elsewhere—is musically accented by the deep tones of Thurl Ravenscroft. The pair are briefly adopted as pets by an animal-obsessed girl (identified as Clara in the theatrical poster), and she ties Snoopy up. Then Clara locks Woodstock in a cage while he's trying to save Snoopy. Clara's mother lets her keep the beagle; Clara is excited to have Snoopy (whom she calls "Rex") as her "sheepdog". 

She bathes him (and he tries to escape, but fails) and dresses him up. At Clara's tea party, Snoopy escapes her clutches and tries to call for help, but she catches him, takes his dress off, and ties him up again. Then she declares, "Mom says, if I'm gonna keep you, I gotta take you to the vet for a check-up. You probably need about a dozen shots." Clara walks Snoopy to the vet; he causes a fight and escapes. He returns to Clara's house and frees Woodstock, but Clara returns and a chase ensues until she ends up with a full fishbowl stuck on her head, prompting their escape. Later that evening, Snoopy and Woodstock camp out, play football and make music while preparing dinner.

Snoopy finally reaches the hospital, but again, no dogs are allowed. To add further insult, the hospital does not allow birds either. Snoopy is foiled in his first attempt to sneak into Lila's room, but his second attempt is successful. He then keeps Lila company. Lila tells Snoopy that his visit helped her to get better. She then asks Snoopy to go home with her, but he has doubts. Snoopy decides to go back home to Charlie Brown. 

However, when he sees Lila watching him tearfully from her hospital window, Snoopy finds it's too hard to leave her and he runs back, which she takes as a sign that he wants to live with her. But first, he needs to "settle his affairs" and say goodbye. Snoopy writes a letter disposing of his property: Linus gets his croquet and chess sets, while Schroeder receives Snoopy's record collection. All Charlie Brown receives is Snoopy's best wishes.

The kids throw Snoopy a large, tearful going-away party, each one bringing a gift (all of which turn out to be bones). The kids closest to Snoopy get up to say a few words in his honor. But during Charlie Brown's turn, he is overwhelmed to the point of silence. After giving Snoopy his present, he finally wails out in pain with Snoopy doing likewise. The rest of the gang, even Lucy, eventually follows suit when Schroeder plays "It's a Long Way to Tipperary" on his piano.

After Snoopy leaves, Charlie Brown is unable to sleep or eat. When Snoopy arrives at Lila's apartment building the next day, he sees a sign next to the front door, "No dogs allowed in the building." Snoopy is overjoyed that this gives him an excuse to return to Charlie Brown. Lila arrives and Snoopy is reluctantly introduced to her pet cat. Snoopy shows Lila the sign, and she has no choice but to allow Snoopy to leave. He joyfully returns to Charlie Brown.

Back home, the children are overjoyed to see Snoopy return, carrying him on high to his doghouse. Once there, using his typewriter, Snoopy demands the kids return the items he gave them. Charlie Brown declares, "Mine says, that since he gave me nothing, I owe him nothing." Lucy snaps, "That does it, Charlie Brown! He's your dog and you're welcome to him!" The gang, annoyed, then leaves Charlie Brown and Snoopy; Charlie walks crossly away. The end credits are typed out by Woodstock as Snoopy dictates.

Cast
 Bill Melendez as Snoopy and Woodstock
 Chad Webber as Charlie Brown
 Robin Kohn as Lucy van Pelt
 Stephen Shea as Linus van Pelt
 David Carey as Schroeder
 Johanna Baer as Lila
 Hilary Momberger as Sally Brown
 Chris De Faria as Peppermint Patty 
 Linda Ercoli as Clara (speaking/singing)
 Linda Mendelson as Frieda

Patty, Pig-Pen, Violet, Franklin, Shermy, Roy, and 5 appear but had no lines.

Production

Snoopy speaks 
Snoopy, Come Home marked the first time Snoopy's thoughts are fully communicated to the audience outside of the comic strip. This was achieved by having his typed correspondences appear at the top of the frame, giving the viewer full access to his thoughts. Previously, Schulz had opted to mute Snoopy entirely, except for inflected squealing and growling. Snoopy's thought balloons, though overt in the strip, are not translated in the animated projects.

Music 
Snoopy, Come Home was the only Peanuts animated project produced during Vince Guaraldi's lifetime (1928–76) that did not contain a musical score by the noted jazz composer. Guaraldi had composed all the previous Peanuts animated television specials as well as the debut film A Boy Named Charlie Brown. Music for this film was instead provided by the Sherman Brothers, who had composed some of the music used in various Disney films and theme park attractions. Schulz said this was an experiment, as he had wanted to have more of a commercial "Disney" feel to Snoopy, Come Home. "Everybody felt that the first movie had too much the 'feel' of the TV specials," said producer Lee Mendelson in 2011. "We collectively thought that we needed more of a feature film 'look' and score. That's why we went to the Shermans, who at the time were No. 1 in their field for such things."

Schulz later said he had planned on utilizing Guaraldi's services for the third Peanuts feature, Race for Your Life, Charlie Brown, had the composer not died suddenly in February 1976. A soundtrack was released by Columbia Masterworks, but is now out of print.

Release 
The film was released on August 9, 1972, by National General Pictures, produced by Lee Mendelson Film Productions, Bill Melendez Productions (uncredited in copyright), Sopwith Productions and Cinema Center Films (in the latter's final production). It was first televised on November 5, 1976, as a CBS Special Film Presentation becoming a CBS feature special.

Reception 
Snoopy, Come Home grossed $245,073 at the box office, against a $1 million budget.

, the film had a 93% rating on review aggregate website Rotten Tomatoes, based on 14 reviews with an average score of 7.70/10. The New York Times said: "This sprightly, clever and hilarious treat—all that a comic strip could be on the screen—is even better than A Boy Named Charlie Brown, which began the series."

Accolades 
The film won a CEC Award for Best Children's Film becoming its first recipient.

Home media 
The film was released on VHS, CED, and LaserDisc in 1984, 1985, February 20, 1992, 1995 by 20th Century Fox Home Entertainment, and May 29, 2001 on VHS by Paramount Home Entertainment, and re-released on DVD in anamorphic widescreen in the U.S. on March 28, 2006, by Paramount Home Entertainment/CBS Home Entertainment (CBS owned Cinema Center Films, which co-produced the film). The film was released on Blu-ray in November 2016 along with A Boy Named Charlie Brown.

See also 

 Peanuts filmography

References

External links 

 
 
 

1970s American animated films
1970s musical comedy-drama films
1970s buddy comedy-drama films
1972 animated films
1972 comedy films
1972 drama films
1972 films
American buddy comedy films
American children's animated comedy films
American children's animated musical films
American musical comedy-drama films
Animated buddy films
Animated films about dogs
Children's comedy-drama films
Cinema Center Films films
1970s English-language films
Films about animal rights
Films directed by Bill Melendez
Films with screenplays by Charles M. Schulz
Musicals based on comic strips
Musicals by the Sherman Brothers
Peanuts films
Peanuts music
Works based on Peanuts (comic strip)
1970s children's animated films